The Maastricht School of Management (MSM) is a management school in Maastricht, the Netherlands. On 20 May 2022, the Maastricht School of Management board agreed to its integration into Maastricht University. From 1 September 2022  MSM will be one of UM's six faculties within the  Maastricht University School of Business and Economics (SBE). MSM's activities in the fields of education, research, and capacity building will continue as part of University of Maastricht.

Programs

MSM offers accredited programs in Maastricht and in collaboration with partner institutions in a number of countries across the world. Core programs are the Master of Business Administration (MBA), Executive MBA (EMBA), and Doctor of Business Administration (DBA). Furthermore, the School offers Master of Science (MSc), Master in Management, Online MBA and a range of executive programs.

Accreditations 
All the degree programs of MSM are subject to the standards set by the following international accrediting bodies:
AMBA, IACBE and ACBSP.

All the degree and non-degree programs of MSM are subject to the standards set by the international accrediting body:
ATHEA.

All MSc / MBA programs of MSM offered in the Netherlands are subject to NVAO accreditation.

Projects
The school engages in development projects involving the public and private sectors in collaboration with international development agencies and donor organizations. It is also recognized by the Chinese government. MSM is in partnership with the Nanjing University Business School.

References

External links 
 Maastricht School of Management official website

Business schools in the Netherlands
Education in Maastricht
1952 establishments in the Netherlands